Rayson Lisung Huang,  (1 September 1920 − 8 April 2015), was a Hong Kong chemist, who was an expert on radicals. He was the first Chinese Vice-Chancellor of The University of Hong Kong, a position in which he served from 1972 until 1986.

Early years
Huang's family came from Shantou, Guangdong. He completed his primary and secondary education at Munsang College, where his father was the founding principal. He later attended St. John's University in Shanghai in 1937, but his studies were interrupted by the Japanese invasion. After 1938 he continued his studies as a scholarship student at The University of Hong Kong. In Hong Kong Huang majored in chemistry at St. John's Hall (now called St. John's College). In addition to his academic studies, Huang was an accomplished violinist. Following the Japanese invasion of Hong Kong in 1941, Huang briefly worked with British auxiliary forces and was responsible for detecting chemical weapons. In 1942 his studies at the University were interrupted when the school was forced to close.  Huang returned to China in 1942 and arrived in Guangxi. By 1945 Huang had followed other members of The University of Hong Kong chemistry department to Britain and received a scholarship to study at the University of Oxford's Institute of Chemistry. He received at doctorate in chemistry and subsequently pursued his post-doctoral research at the University of Chicago. During his study in Chicago, he met his future wife Grace Wei Huang.

Academic career
In 1951, Huang taught chemistry at the University of Malaya in Singapore (now National University of Singapore) and later he was transferred to University of Malaya's Kuala Lumpur campus. He became a tenured professor of chemistry and then acting Vice-Chancellor and Dean of the Faculty of Science.

University administrator

In 1969 Huang was appointed as Vice-Chancellor at Nanyang University in Singapore.

In 1972 Huang became the first Chinese Vice-Chancellor of The University of Hong Kong and quelled a student demonstration during a royal visit to Hong Kong. In addition, he served in various capacities including becoming a member of the Hong Kong Basic Law Drafting Committee in drafting Hong Kong's post handover constitution. Rayson Huang and his wife retired in 1994 and lived with their son.

Retirement and post-academic life

By 1999 the Huang's returned to Hong Kong. His wife Grace who was suffering from senile dementia then died in Hong Kong.

To commemorate his wife's life, Rayson Huang established the Grace Wei Huang Memorial Fund. and authored a memoir, A Lifetime in Academia: An autobiography by Rayson Huang
, the proceeds from which will be set aside for the fund.

Huang had a wide range of hobbies, one of the most special having been the study of violin making. He returned to Hong Kong on a regular basis. Huang also established the Progress of Hong Kong's Rayson Huang and the "Rayson Huang Foundation." in Malaysia.

References

External links
The oral history of Rayson Huang - Hong Kong Memory

1920 births
2015 deaths
St. John's University, Shanghai alumni
Alumni of the University of Hong Kong
Alumni of St. John's Hall, University of Hong Kong
Alumni of the University of Oxford
Academic staff of the University of Hong Kong
Vice-Chancellors of the University of Hong Kong
Academic staff of the National University of Singapore
Members of the Legislative Council of Hong Kong
Hong Kong Basic Law Consultative Committee members
Hong Kong Basic Law Drafting Committee members
Commanders of the Order of the British Empire
Vice-chancellors of universities in Malaysia
Hong Kong expatriates in Malaysia